The 1932 Colorado Silver and Gold football team was an American football team that represented the University of Colorado as a member of the Rocky Mountain Conference (RMC) during the 1932 college football season. Led by first-year head coach Head coach Bill Saunders, Colorado compiled an overall record of 2–4 with an identical mark in conference play, placing eighth in the RMC.

Schedule

References

Colorado
Colorado Buffaloes football seasons
Colorado Silver and Gold football